The Southern Fleet, which is under command of the Southern Forward Naval Headquarters (SNFHQ), compromises the 1st, the 2nd and the 3rd naval regions of the Islamic Republic of Iran Navy. The SNFHQ is based in Bandar Abbas, and is responsible for coordination across its three southern districts as a forward operating base, as well as presence of units in international missions off Iranian territorial waters.

History

18th century

20th century

Structure 
The jurisdiction and responsibilities of the navy was redefined in 2007, as a result, the southern fleet was reorganized.

Before 2007 
Prior to these changes, the organization of the southern fleet was as follows:

Since 2007 
The forces under command of the southern fleet currently operate under these districts:

Commanders 

 Commodore Abbas Ramzi Ataie
 Rear Admiral Kamal Habibollahi (October 1972–January 1976)
 Captain Mohammad-Hossein Malekzadegan (1983–1985)
 Commodore Ebrahim Ashkan (?–2017)
 Vice Commodore Afshin Tashak (2017–present)

Order of battle

Submarines 
  
  (reported out of water as of January 2021)
  (reported out of water as of January 2021)
  (reported out of water as of January 2021)
  
  (active as of 2021)
 s (about 20 were believed to be operational as of 2020)
  (rarely seen on operation)

Surface combatants 
  
  (active as of 2020)
  (active as of 2020)
  (active as of 2020)
  
 (active as of 2020) 
 (active as of 2020)

  
 
 
  
  (active as of 2020) 
  (active as of 2020)
  (active as of 2020)
  (active as of 2020)
  (active as of 2020) 
  (active as of 2020) 
  (active as of 2020) 
  (active as of 2020) 
  (active as of 2020)

References 

Islamic Republic of Iran Navy
Naval fleets